Achrosis serpentinaria is a moth of the family Geometridae first described by Francis Walker in 1866. It is found in India and Sri Lanka.

References

Moths of Asia
Moths described in 1866